Macarthur Astronomical Society is an organisation of amateur astronomers, based in the Macarthur Region of outer South Western Sydney, NSW, Australia, including the local government areas of the City of Campbelltown, Camden Council, Wollondilly Shire, the City of Liverpool and surrounding districts.

Objectives and activities
The constitutionally adopted objectives of the Society are: (i) to foster the science of Astronomy; (ii) to organise observational field nights for the purpose of carrying out astronomical observation; (iii) to assist and give advice regarding astronomical instrumentation; and (iv) to participate in/co-operate with other scientific societies and groups with a similar scientific interest in astronomy.

In keeping with these objectives, the Society's three core activities are:
 The Macarthur Astronomy Forum.
 Dark sky astronomical observing nights for members. These are held regularly at two locations: the Dudley Chesham Sports ground at The Oaks, owned by Wollondilly Council; and a property at Belanglo Forest, owned by International House, University of Sydney, for the purpose of telescopic observing and astro-imaging.
 Public outreach events, which include visits to schools and other community organisations; and open nights for the general public, generally held at either the Campbelltown Rotary Observatory at Western Sydney University  or the Dudley Chesham Sports Ground, The Oaks.

Formation and management
Formed in 1996 in Ingleburn, NSW by Philip Ainsworth, Macarthur Astronomical Society Inc. is registered as an independent Incorporated Association by the NSW Office of Fair Trading. Its affairs are governed by its own constitution and managed by an elected seven member Management Committee. The Financial year commences on 1 March. As required by the Office of Fair Trading, the Secretary of the Society acts as Public Officer. The Society is approved by the NSW Commissioner of Police for the purpose of an exemption from obtaining a laser pointer permit.

Macarthur Astronomy Forum
The monthly meetings of the Society provide a platform for professional astronomers and prominent amateur astronomers, on each third Monday (Jan.to Nov.). These meetings were renamed the Macarthur Astronomy Forum in 2011. Guest speakers have included Nobel Laureate Professor Brian Schmidt, Professor Bryan Gaensler, Australia's Astronomer at Large, Professor Fred Watson, Dr Mark Phillips and NASA astronaut Greg Chamitoff.

Office holders

List of Patrons
 1996–2011 Dr. Ragbir Bhathal, (University of Western Sydney).
 2009–2020 Professor Bryan Gaensler (University of Toronto, Canada); Young Australian of the Year 1999; and former Director of the ARC Centre of Excellence for All-sky Astrophysics (CAASTRO).
 2020-current Professor Geraint Lewis (University of Sydney).

Patrons are appointed by the Management Committee. Between 2009 and 2011 the Society had dual Patrons.

Presidents 
 1996–2000 Phillip Ainsworth
 2000–2007 Noel Sharpe
 2007–2011 John Rombi
 2011–2012 Trevor Rhodes
 2012–2015 Chris Malikoff
 2015–2019 Tony Law
2019-2020 Allan Hobbs
 2020- current  John Rombi

Management Committee 
The Committee is tasked with the total management of the affairs of the Society and aims to mix youth with experience. It meets monthly and consists of a President, Vice-President, Secretary, Treasurer and three other Committee Members. Office bearers are elected by the membership at an Annual General Meeting, normally held in April each year. Whilst a ballot is provided for, the Society has traditionally never received more than one nomination per position, thus a ballot has never been held.

Awards
On 9 December 2014, MAS won the University of Western Sydney (renamed Western Sydney University in 2015) "Excellence in Partnership Award". The University awards this to recognize the many and highly valued contributions of the University's community partners. The accompanying citation reads: "The Macarthur Astronomical Society has, in partnership with the Campbelltown Rotary Observatory, conducted astronomy talks and activities to bring the latest advances in physics, astrophysics and high technology to the community. This enables the community to participate in debates about science in an informed manner with experts and politicians."

Youth in Astronomy
The Society instituted an annual Students Night in 2015, to encourage school children from Prairewood High School to study the science of astronomy and report their research findings to the Society's Macarthur Astronomy Forum in December each year.

During 2018, a Student Mentoring Programme was introduced to assist year 7 – 11 students at Broughton Anglican College to complete a scientific astronomical investigation as part of their science courses.

Publications and exhibitions

Journal

The Society's journal "Prime Focus" was published monthly, for the benefit of members, between 1996 and 2012. Initially the publication was a printed edition but since 2009 it was distributed electronically. In 2011, the first colour editions were published and printed copies became available again. The journal ceased in October 2012 but resumed for a brief period in 2020.

Publications
The Society has published two DVDs, "magnitude" and "magnitude II", both containing the best astro-images taken by its members.

Authors
The Society has the following authors of astronomy books within its ranks. 
 Robert Bee (member): author of "Heavens Above - A Binocular Guide to the Southern Skies" and "Star Hopping To The Messiers".
 Chris Malikoff (member): Ice In Space "2009 Compendium"'
 Professor Bryan Gaensler (Patron): author of "Extreme Cosmos".
 Dr. Ragbir Bhathal (Hon. Member): author of several books, including: "Under the Southern Cross: A Brief History of Astronomy in Australia"; "Australian Astronomers: Achievements at the Frontiers of Astronomy"; "Australian Backyard Astronomy" and "Mt. Stromlo Observatory - From Bush Observatory to the Nobel Prize".
 Prof Geraint Lewis (Patron) : author (with Dr Luke Barnes) of "A Fortunate Universe" and "The Cosmic Revolutionary's Handbook".

Exhibitions
The Society has held major public exhibitions displaying the astro-photographic work of its members: 
magnitude  in October 2010. at the Campbelltown Arts Centre.
 magnitude II  in July 2012 at the Campbelltown Arts Centre.
 magnitude III in February 2014 at University of Western Sydney.
 Photographers of the Month in June and July 2018 at Camden Library, Narellan, NSW.

Observatory
In 2011, the Society set up a sub-committee to seek a suitable site - remote from city lighting, yet within easy reach of Campbelltown/Camden - at which to locate its first astronomical observatory.  
In 2012, a suitable site was identified in the Dharawal National Park and the Society is pursuing opportunities to secure use of the site. The location was until recently the site of the North Cliff coal mine, operated by BHP Billiton. Whilst anticipating some opposition to placing an observatory in a national park, the Society was inspired by the Australian Astronomical Observatory in the Warrumbungles National Park and the concept has received much local support.

If successful, the observatory would have been used for astronomical research, public outreach, astro-imaging and members private observing. Whilst the proposal was welcomed in the community and supported by the mine lease-holder, it did not gain the necessary government support.

Volunteer computing
The Society organises a volunteer computing team for the purpose of carrying out scientific research using the Berkeley Open Infrastructure for Network Computing (BOINC) Project Management middleware platform, which allows users to contribute to a range of scientific computing projects at the same time. Volunteer computing is often also referred to as Citizen science, Distributed computing or Grid computing. The team is currently working as volunteers on projects for theSkyNet, SETI@home, Einstein@home, asteroids@home, LHC@home and other BOINC projects.

See also
 List of telescopes of Australia
 List of astronomical societies

References

External links
 Official Website
 Official Facebook page
 Official Twitter page

Astronomy in Australia
Organizations established in 1996
Astronomy organizations
Amateur astronomy organizations
Scientific organisations based in Australia